"Before Tomorrow Comes" is a song by American hard rock band Alter Bridge and the third international, fourth overall, and final single from the band's second album Blackbird. On April 3, 2008, the song was announced to be the fourth single in the United Kingdom and the third single released worldwide. It debuted at No. 36 on Billboard Mainstream Rock Tracks and peaked at No. 29.

References

2008 singles
2007 songs
Alter Bridge songs
Songs written by Mark Tremonti
Songs written by Myles Kennedy
Songs written by Brian Marshall
Songs written by Scott Phillips (musician)
Universal Republic Records singles
Song recordings produced by Michael Baskette